Primitive Methodism was a major movement in English and Welsh Methodism from about 1810 until the Methodist Union in 1932. It emerged from a revival at Mow Cop in Staffordshire. Primitive meant "simple" or "relating to an original stage"; the Primitive Methodists saw themselves as practising a purer form of Christianity, closer to the earliest Methodists. Although the denomination did not bear the name "Wesleyan" (unlike the Wesleyan Methodist Church, from which they separated), Primitive Methodism was Wesleyan in theology, in contrast to the Calvinistic Methodists.

Features
Primitive Methodists were marked by the relatively plain design of their chapels and their low church worship, compared with the Wesleyan Methodist Church, from which they had split. Their social base was among the poorer members of society, who appreciated its content (damnation, salvation, sinners and saints) and its style (direct, spontaneous and passionate). It was democratic and locally controlled, as compared with the more middle-class Wesleyan Methodists and the establishment-controlled Church of England, which were not democratic in governance. Even so, it was too formal for some adherents, who moved on to Pentecostalism. Growth was strong in the mid-19th century, but declined after 1900 with the growing secularism in society, competition from other Nonconformisms such as William Booth's Salvation Army, a resurgence of Anglicanism among the working classes, and competition among various Methodist bodies.

Gradually the differences between the Primitive Methodists and the Wesleyans lessened and the two denominations eventually merged with the United Methodists, to become the Methodist Church of Great Britain in 1932. In the United States, the Primitive Methodist Church has continued to this day, and some individual British Methodist churches also retain their Primitive traditions.

Origins

Primitive Methodism originated in "camp meetings" held in the area of The Potteries at Mow Cop, Staffordshire, on 31 May 1807. This led in 1811 to a joining of two groups, the 'Camp Meeting Methodists' and the Clowesites led by Hugh Bourne and William Clowes, respectively.

The movement was spawned by followers of these men. Bourne and Clowes were charismatic evangelists with reputations for zeal and sympathy for ideas the Wesleyan Connexion condemned. Their least acceptable belief for the Wesleyan Connexion was support for the so-called camp meetings: day-long, open air meetings involving public praying, preaching and Love Feasts.

Clowes was a first-generation Methodist convert — at the age of 25 he renounced his desire to be the finest dancer in England. The movement was also influenced by the backgrounds of the two men: Clowes had worked as a potter while Bourne had been a wheelwright. Both had been expelled from the Wesleyan Connexion — Bourne in 1808, and Clowes in 1810. The reason given for Clowes' expulsion was that he had behaved "contrary to the Methodist discipline" and therefore "that he could not be either a preacher or leader unless he promised to attend no more Camp Meetings."

It seems likely that this was not the only concern over the pair. Bourne's association with the American evangelist Lorenzo Dow would have put him in a dim light with Wesleyan leaders. The Wesleyan leadership's hostility to Dow is demonstrated by a threat Dow received from prominent Wesleyan Thomas Coke (twice president of the Conference, in 1797 and 1805) on his arrival in London about 1799. Coke threatened to "write to Lord Castlereagh to inform him who and what you are, [and] that we disown you,... Then you'll be arrested and committed to prison."

The Wesleyan Connexion was also concerned about Bourne and Clowes' association with the "Magic Methodists" or "Forest Methodists" led by James Crawfoot, the "old man of Delamere Forest". Crawfoot was significant to both Bourne and Clowes and was for a time their spiritual mentor. He held prayer meetings where people had visions and fell into trances. Crawfoot, according to Owen Davies, had developed a reputation for possessing supernatural powers. Indeed, Henry Wedgwood, writing later in the century, recalled that many locals at the time were terrified of the magical powers of an innkeeper called Zechariah Baddeley, but that they considered Baddeley's powers as nothing next to Crawfoot's prayers and preaching.

The enthusiasm associated with revivalism was seen as disreputable by the early 19th century establishment. In 1799, the Bishop of Lincoln claimed that the "ranter" element of Methodism was so dangerous that the government must ban itinerancy. Men like Bourne and Clowes were not educated, and their preaching and mass conversion was felt as threatening. The Wesleyan Methodists, such as Coke, wanted to distance themselves from such populism. The death of John Wesley removed a restraining influence on popular Methodism: there was no obvious leader or authority, and power was invested in the Wesleyan Conference. The Wesleyans formally split from the Church of England, which led to greater organisation and self-definition. The leadership could then withhold the tickets of members like Bourne and Clowes, who did not behave in the way expected by the Conference. The result was less tolerance for internal dissent and weakening of the movement's leadership.

The Camp Meeting Methodists looked back to the early days of the Methodist movement, when field preaching was acceptable. Despite their exclusion from the Connexion, Clowes and Bourne and assistants who appeared to help them became involved in a task which The Romance of Primitive Methodism saw as a work of primary evangelisation. The same book also regards the Primitive Methodist denomination as an independent growth rather than as an offshoot of mainstream Methodism.

Response to the political situation
The leadership of the newly formed Methodist Church was made particularly sensitive to criticism by international events. Britain had been involved in almost perpetual war with France since 1793. A succession of defeats to allies and the threat of the "Continental System" increased tension at home.

The establishment faced a threat from the revolutionary anti-monarchical beliefs of the French government. The war and the French Revolution encouraged a fear of a rebellion in Britain. The repressive laws enacted by the second Pitt ministry came from fear of internal dissent.

In this atmosphere the Methodist leadership feared repression and strove to avoid antagonising the government. The Methodist movement challenged the Church of England — an institution widely regarded as a bulwark of national stability. As Hugh McLeod highlights, Methodist members and preachers could be outspoken in their criticism of the Church of England. The movement grew rapidly, especially amongst the expanding working classes.

The combination of rapid growth, popular appeal, and enthusiasm alarmed many. Fear of the Methodist membership seems to have been shared to an extent by the Wesleyan leadership. Dr Coke even suggested he would not be surprised if, "in a few years some of our people, warmest in politics and coolest in religion, would toast… a bloody summer and a headless king."

The leadership reacted to criticism and their own fears by introducing further discipline. They expelled the prominent Alexander Kilham in 1795, and one year later they forbade any itinerant from any publishing without the sanction of the newly created book committee.

From 1805 the use of hymnals not issued by the Book Room was banned, and in 1807 Camp Meetings were condemned. Through discipline they hoped to evade the tarnish of disloyalty.

The leadership reacted badly to Lorenzo Dow and Bourne's association with him. Dow was a republican and a millenarian. He made wild anti-establishment speeches and drew no distinction between religion and politics. In a tract of 1812, he preached: "May not the 'Seventh Trumpet' now be sounding, and the 'seven last plagues' be pouring out?" Dow accused the British government of tyranny and repugnance to God's laws of nature. As a separate church, conscious of their own public image and fearing repression, they felt they had to disassociate themselves from him. The Wesleyan leadership's measures to evade repression led to greater internal discipline. Members who were seen as a liability were expelled. Views that were anti-establishment were condemned.

Wesleyan propaganda

The Wesleyan leadership did not seek to improve its reputation with discipline alone. Through propaganda it capitalised on a greater level of discipline in an attempt to reform its image. Hempton claims the Methodists used propaganda to project an industrious and well disposed image. The Methodist Magazine printed supportive tracts about the monarchy, praising the King's wariness of reformers. The movement was portrayed as a conservative force, with the leadership claiming Methodism promoted "subordination and industry in the lower orders". In promoting this image of Methodists, the Wesleyan leaders also sought to escape old slurs. One obstacle to Methodist respectability was its association with ignorance and superstition. In Wales in 1801, the leadership warned its members against involvement in sorcery, magic, and witchcraft. In 1816, 50 members of the Portland Methodist Society were struck off for maintaining belief in the supernatural. This demonstrates that the Wesleyan transition to denominational conservatism resulted in less toleration for alternate beliefs and non-bourgeois beliefs. So the association of Bourne and Clowes with Crawfoot was unacceptable to the leadership. It also suggests a gulf between the outlook of the Wesleyan leadership and the Methodist rank and file.

Disillusionment with Wesleyan leaders
There was disillusionment with the Wesleyan leadership's conservatism and with financial policies. The reaction of the Yorkshire membership to its support of the government after Peterloo is illustrated by a rumour that it had "lent the government half a million of money to buy cannon to shoot them with". When a local preacher in North Shields criticised the actions of the magistrates at Peterloo, he faced criticism from itinerants and "respectable friends". The leadership judged, however, that it could not afford to expel this preacher because of the support he commanded locally. The incident showed that the leadership was not representing the interests and views of some Methodists. Its policies frequently clashed with poorer Methodists. In efforts to raise money, it introduced weekly and quarterly dues, yearly collections, the payment of class and ticket money, and seat rents. Such fees bore severely on the poor in the war years and the subsequent depression, opening a gulf between richer and poorer members. Seat rents marginalised a chapel's poor, while exalting the rich. The poor were often relegated to the least popular part of the chapel, and their involvement was implicitly devalued. At one of the earliest chapels, Walpole Old Chapel in Suffolk, attendance had once been an act of pride in the face of social superiors, but now reinforced inferiority. Such developments led to the disillusionment of rural Methodists. The poor contributions of many rural societies to the Connexion funds led to pastoral neglect. To illustrate the disillusionment of many, a pamphleteer in 1814 said, "You complain the preachers never call to see you unless you are great folks.... Well you may see the reason; you can do nothing for them; money they want and money they must and will have." Such disillusionment of many Methodists with the leadership of the Wesleyan Conference increased the possibility of schism.

What was at stake
The crucial factor was that the events came at a time when the movement had more to lose than ever before. Its withdrawal from the Church of England made chapel building and a larger ministry a necessity, while the Connexion also invested in schools, pension funds and foreign missions. Hard work and clean living had allowed many Methodists to increase their wealth and own property. All this could be lost to a fearful wartime government or a baying mob.

The Wesleyan "clergy" derived its income from the Church and had a vested interest in ensuring a conservative policy. It was easier for men from the lower sorts, artisans like Bourne and Clowes. Bourne was a successful businessman (a carpenter whose contacts included supplying pit-props for local coal mines) and Clowes was a master potter, who had worked his way up from working in potteries as a young boy and married into the Wedgwood family. They both had considerable education, though not at university like John Wesley, but through their own hard work earning a living. Did they have less to lose? What counted for them was a sensed call of God to continue the evangelistic work of John Wesley. In taking the name "Primitive Methodist", the Prims looked back to the original and unspoiled Christianity of both John Wesley and (Wesley's reference) of the Book of Acts. By contrast to the academic treatises on Primitive Methodism, original Primitive Methodist sources included definitive histories by Holliday Bickerstaffe Kendall, early biographies of Hugh Bourne like that by Jesse Ashworth from personal acquaintance, and Joseph Ritson's classic The Romance of Primitive Methodism. These illustrate a vibrant movement which the establishment was unwilling to entertain, due partly to weariness of persecutions in the 18th century, and to political upheavals after the French Revolution and various wars in which Britain was engaged. In fact Bourne was much concerned that things be done decently and in order, and worked hard to build up the official (Wesleyan) Methodist Circuit of which he had once been a member. He had founded and built at least one Chapel, largely at his own expense, given to the Circuit. It was the issue of Camp Meetings, which Bourne and his companions saw as blessed by God, that led to their expulsion. They had not sought to found a new and separate denomination or put revivalism ahead of expediency. They had less to lose. So the Primitive Methodist movement can be seen as a reaction to the Wesleyan drive towards respectability and denominationalism. It was led by the poor and for the poor.

Similarities and differences
Perceived irreconcilable differences led to the schism in the Methodist movement and the formation of Primitive Methodism, but in the early 20th century, the Wesleyans and Primitives were reconciled and reunited.

The structure of the Primitive Methodists, though broadly similar to the Wesleyan Connexion, showed some pronounced differences. Both Primitives and Wesleyans employed a connexion system, employing a combination of itinerant and local preachers. Both included an array of local, circuit, district, and connexion officials and committees. According to James Obelkevich, Primitive Methodism was more decentralised and democratic. Julia Werner concurs that the movement was decentralised. Most decisions and day-to-day policy were decided at a local level. The circuits were virtually autonomous and their administration was not dominated by church officials, but by the laity.

The expansion of the movement through commissioning new missions was directed by individuals or circuits, not by a central authority. Decisions affecting the whole movement were taken at annual meetings. Even these were highly democratic, with the laity outnumbering the itinerants in voting power. The "church" could not dictate policy to its members. Compare the expulsions of Kilham from the Wesleyans (1795) and an outspoken "malcontent" from the Primitive Methodists (1824). While Bourne had to engage in a long and difficult argument before winning a vote, Dr Coke rejected a democratic decision-making process. In the early years of Primitive Methodism the membership had considerable power and freedom.

Although the Wesleyans tended towards respectability, Primitives were poor and revivalist. According to J. E. Minor, Primitive Methodist preachers were less educated and more likely "to be at one with their congregations" or even "dominated by them". Primitive Methodist preachers were plain-speaking, in contrast to Wesleyan services "embellished with literary allusions and delivered in high-flown language". Primitive Methodist preachers were plainly dressed and poorly paid. Though Wesleyan ministers in 1815 could command about £100, a house and a horse, the Primitive Methodist superintendent of the Gainsborough circuit received £62 12s in 1852. The second minister at the Gainsborough circuit received £36, about as much a farm labourer. If Primitive Methodist preachers lacked money, they were expected to turn to the Lord for support. There was also a disparity in the wealth of congregations. The Wesleyan ones were more likely to be from a lower middle class or artisan, background than the Primitive Methodists. Primitive Methodists were most likely to be small farmers, servants, mill workers, colliers, agricultural labourers, weavers and framework knitters.

The Primitive Methodists exalted its poor congregations by glorifying plain dress and speech, for two reasons: they thought plain dress was enjoined by the Gospel, and because it made them distinctive. In a time when Wesleyans sought assimilation and respectability, they wanted to stand out as a "peculiar people". The Primitive Methodist movement made a virtue out of difference.

Preaching and revivalism
The Primitives were more likely to go against society's norms. This is indicated in the Primitive Methodists' maintenance of revivalism. They were visible and noisy; they made use of revivalist techniques such as open-air preaching.

Their services involved a fanatical zeal that Wesleyan leaders would have found embarrassing. The hymns they sang were strongly marked by popular culture and not seen as respectable. They were often sung to popular tunes and full of references to Heaven as a place of opulence. As Werner comments, their hymns were a contrast to the "more staid hymns sung in Wesleyan chapels". All their members were seen as equal and addressed as brother or sister; even children could participate fully. Many children actually became preachers, for instance boy preachers such as Thomas Brownsword, Robinson Cheeseman and John Skevington. There were also many girl preachers, such as Elizabeth White and Martha Green, who preached as 15-year-olds.

The Wesleyan Conference condemned female ministry in 1803, so effectively closing its doors to female preaching. Women were limited to working in Sunday Schools and speaking at "Dorcas Meetings". By contrast, Primitive Methodism allowed the poor, the young, and women to gain public influence. The Primitive Methodists were more receptive to such views, and so took a different line on the supernatural. Wesleyans tried hard to distance themselves from superstition, and superstitious popular culture. The Primitive Methodists engaged with popular beliefs in presenting God as one whose powers could be called upon by preachers.

Examples can be found in the Primitive Methodist Magazine. For instance, the December 1824 edition contains an anecdote of a cripple being healed through her conversion to Primitive Methodism. The November edition from the same year contains a chapter on "raising the dead" under the title A Treatise on the Cultivation of the Spiritual Gifts. Primitive Methodists saw the Lord's work in everything. The Primitive Methodist Magazine of 1821 asserting that the movement had begun "undesigned of man" and was an example of "Divine Providence". The magazine continues to reveal further examples of God's power and favour towards them. A man who set out against the Primitive Methodists was struck down by illness, and a preacher who became lost and stranded was saved when the Lord sent people to find him.

The leadership clearly believed in what many at the time would have derided as popular superstition. For example, Clowes claimed to have fought with the Kidsgrove Boggart as a young man and Bourne believed in witches. About a woman he met at Ramsor, Bourne wrote, "I believe she will prove to be a witch. These are the head labourers under Satan, like as the fathers are the head labourers under Jesus Christ.... For the witches throughout the world all meet and have connection with the power devil." The magazine finds exaltations of the laity one of the most important happenings at Camp Meetings. For instance, it reports that at Sheshnall in 1826, a woman fell to the ground under the purifying power of the Lord, and another cried aloud.

Common factors
The Primitive and the Wesleyan Methodists had much in common. They were both initially very anti-Catholic. Their social background was not completely different. There were many poor Wesleyans. It was in influence that middle-class Wesleyans dominated the movement, not in numbers. Many Wesleyans did not agree or abide by official policy. Many were sympathetic to revivalism and popular culture. The existence of an alternative sect, Primitive Methodism, did not end dissent.

In official policy and outlook the two movements had much in common. They both centred their teaching on the Bible and shared a similar outlook on society and morality. The Primitives were more radical than the Wesleyan Methodists. Armstrong claims Thomas Cooper found the Primitive Methodists "demurred to [his] reading any book but the Bible, unless it was a truly religious book." Likewise, both wanted to reform popular behaviour. Again the Primitives were more radical than the Wesleyans and less in keeping with bourgeois correctness. Bourne was not just in favour of temperance, he disagreed with alcohol altogether and thought of himself as the father of the teetotal movement. The Primitive Methodists were a religion of popular culture. While the Wesleyans attempted to impose elements of middle-class culture on the lower classes, Primitive Methodists offered an alternate popular culture. They timed their activities to coincide with sinful events. For instance, they vied against the race week at Preston by organising a Sunday School children's parade and a "frugal feast". Both tried to inculcate the doctrine of self-help into the working class. They promoted education through Sunday Schools, though the Primitives distinguished themselves by teaching writing. Through a combination of discipline, preaching and education both Primitive and Wesleyan Methodism sought to reform their members' morality.

By 1850 the Primitives and Wesleyans were showing signs that they could surmount their differences. Primitive Methodism was mellowing. It was less distinctively non-middle-class by 1850 and more in keeping with social norms. Less emphasis was placed on the supernatural. In 1828 Bourne said of trances, "This thing still occasionally breaks out. It is a subject at present not well understood and which requires to be peculiarly guarded against impropriety and imposture." Hymns about hell were sung less frequently. The Providence section of the Primitive Methodist Magazine declined in importance and was dropped altogether in 1862. The revivalist enthusiasm of the Primitive leadership dimmed. Even Clowes, once an ardent enthusiast, became "convinced that religion does not consist in bodily movements, whether shouting, jumping, falling, or standing."

The Primitives became less ardent in their support of the female right to ecclesiastical equality. In 1828 women were forbidden from becoming superintendents, and in mid-century there ceased to be biographies eulogising female preachers in the Methodist Magazine. Elizabeth Bultitude, the last of the women roving preachers died in 1890. Preaching changed considerably. Services became marked by decorum and the ministry increasingly professional. The dress code was dropped in 1828 and preaching became more urban based. The community's values were more in line with middle-class respectability: Parkinson Milson reported that local preachers and class leaders were offended at his plain speech.

Convergence begins
In the 1820s the Primitive Methodists were showing signs of increased conformity. At the same time the Wesleyan Methodists were relaxing their opposition to revivalism.

In 1820 the Conference permitted an altered form of camp meeting but gave it a different name. Wesleyan preachers adopted door-to-door techniques and in 1822 there were numerous open-air meetings. The official Wesleyan attitude was not only softening in regard to Primitive Methodist revivalist techniques. It was also softening in regard to the Primitive Methodist promotion of non-worldliness. The Methodist Magazine printed a series of articles "On the Character of the Early Methodists". The magazine praised their "plain dress" and "simplicity of manners". This represented an attempt to re-engage with the poor. By 1850, both Primitive and Wesleyan Methodists were finding that their differences were less significant and passionate.

In 1864 the Primitives established Elmfield College in York.

The Primitives were becoming more like the Wesleyan Methodists. The same forces that promoted schism in Wesleyan Methodism operated on Primitive Methodism. Their leaders became more conservative as they got older. They showed signs of moving away from revivalism and intending to impose greater discipline on the membership. They experienced some schisms in the 1820s. These Primitive Methodist troubles were blamed on the admission of "improper" preachers and "questionable characters". The sentiment of this explanation is similar to Bunting's comments that "schism from the body will be a less evil than schism in it." The problems in the 1820s were often related to money matters. A decision by the conference of 1826 to impose tighter financial discipline on the circuits led to an exodus of members and 30 itinerants. The movement became more geared towards consolidation through greater organisation. In 1821 preachers were called upon to record their activities and in 1822 a preachers' manual was published. Preachers now had guidelines, an element of accountability had been introduced, and the leadership had stated that the connexional accounts had priority over spreading the word.

Bible
A leading theologian of the Primitive Methodists was Arthur Peake, Professor of Biblical Criticism at University of Manchester in 1904–1929. He popularized modern biblical scholarship, including the new "higher criticism". He approached the Bible not as the infallible word of God, but as a record of revelation written by fallible humans.

Organisation and conferences

In Scotland the Primitive Methodists were poorly funded and had trouble building churches and supporting ministers. Organisationally, the Prims followed many Wesleyan precedents, including grouping local societies into Circuits, and from 1824, grouping Circuits into Districts. By 1824 there were 72 Circuits and four Districts — Tunstall, Nottingham, Hull, and Sunderland.

From 1820, the Primitive Methodists held an annual conference, which was nominally the church's ultimate legal authority. However, from 1843 to 1876 the District Meetings grew in power and popularity at the expense of Conference (Lysons: 22 and ch. 4).

Conference venues included:

Gallery

See also
History of Christianity in Britain
United Brethren (England)

Notes

Further reading
R. W. Ambler, Ranters, Revivalists and Reformers: Primitive Methodism and Rural Society: South Lancashire, 1817-1875 (1989)
Anthony Armstrong, The Church of England, the Methodists and Society 1700–1850 (London, University of London Press, 1973)
Margaret Batty, "Primitive Methodism in Scotland 1826-1932," Proceedings of the Wesley Historical Society 55 (2006), pp. 237–251
D. W. Bebbington, Evangelicalism in Modern Britain (London, Unwin Hyman, 1989)
Robert Colls, The Collier's Rant (London, Croom Helm, 1977)
Owen Davies, Witchcraft, Magic and Culture 1736–1951 (Manchester, Manchester University Press, 1999)
Owen Davies, "Methodism, the Clergy and the Popular Belief in Witchcraft and Magic", History (1997), p. 82
Norman Gash, Aristocracy and People: Britain 1818–1865 (1979)
Ena Dorothy Graham, "Chosen by God: the female travelling preachers of early Primitive Methodism." Proceedings of the Wesley Historical Society 49#3 (1993): 77–95. online version
Stephen W. Gunter, The Limits of Love Divine (Nashville, Kingswood books, 1989)
David Hempton, Methodism and Politics in British Society 1750–1850 (London, Hutchinson and Co., 1984)
John Kent, Holding the Fort (London, Epworth Press, 1978)
Timothy Laursen, "A. S. Peake, the Free Churches and modern biblical criticism." Bulletin of the John Rylands University Library of Manchester (2004) 86#3, pp. 23–53
E. J. Lenton, "Primitive Methodist camp meetings in Shropshire." Proceedings of the Wesley Historical Society 52#1 (1999), pp. 1–14 
Gareth Lloyd, "The Papers of Dr Thomas Coke: a catalogue" with an introduction by Dr John A. Vickers", Bulletin of the John Rylands University Library of Manchester, vol. 76, no. 2 (1994), pp. 205–320
John Lowther, Primitive Methodism (Sunderland, CIL Press, 2003)
John Lowther, Methodism in Sunderland (Sunderland, CIL Press, 2003)
Colin Matthew, The Nineteenth Century (Oxford, Oxford University Press, 2000)
Hugh McLeod, Religion and the Working Class in Nineteenth-Century Britain (Hong Kong, Macmillan Publishers, 1984)
Geoffrey Milburn, Exploring Methodism: Primitive Methodism (Peterborough, Epworth Press, 2002)
J. E. Minor, "The Mantle of Elijah: 19th century Primitive Methodism and 20th century Pentecostalism," p. 142, Proceedings of the Wesleyan Historical Society [GB] (1982, Vol. 43 (6) PT1) pp. 141–149
Robert Moore, Pit-Men Preachers and Politics: The effects of Methodism in a Durham Mining Community (Bristol, Cambridge University Press, 1974)
James Obelkevich, Religion and Rural Society: South Lindsey, 1825–75 (Oxford, Clarendon Press, 1976)
Henry D. Rack, Reasonable Enthusiast: John Wesley and the Rise of Methodism (London, Epworth Press, 1989)
Gerald T. Rimmington, "Methodism and society in Leicester, 1881-1914,"  Local Historian (2000) 30#2, pp. 74–87
E. P. Thompson The Making of the English Working Class (London, Penguin Books, 1991)
D. M. Valenze, Prophetic Sons and Daughters (Princeton, Princeton University Press, 1985)
W. R. Ward, Religion and Society in England 1790–1850 (London, B. T. Batsford, 1972)
Julia Stewart Werner, The Primitive Methodist Connexion; its background and early history. Madison: University of Wisconsin Press, 1984
D. M. Young, "The great River: Primitive Methodism till 1868" (Stoke-on-Trent: Tentmaker Publications 2016)
D. M. Young, "Change and Decay: Primitive Methodism from late Victorian Times till World War 1" (Stoke-on-Trent: Tentmaker Publications 2017)
D. M. Young, "The Primitive Methodist Mission to North Wales" (Wesley Historical Society (Wales) in association with Tentmaker Publications, Stoke-on-Trent, 2016)

Primary sources
The Primitive Methodist Hymnal, "Published by James B. Knapp, Sutton Street, Commercial Road, E. 1890"
Primitive Methodist Magazine, (Derby, Richardson and Handford, Marketplace, 1821)
Primitive Methodist Magazine, (Derby, Richardson and Handford, Marketplace, 1824)
Primitive Methodist Magazine, (Derby, Richardson and Handford, Marketplace, 1826)
Primitive Methodist Baptism Records, Sunderland Local Studies Centre.

External links
Pate, Deborah. "What were the distinctive characteristics of working-class Evangelicalism?"
"The Rise of Manx Methodism, 1775–1851"
"William Clowes 1780–1851"
"The Nixons of Lowtown"
Englesea Brook Chapel and Museum – features the story of working-class religion in the nineteenth century, particularly as it was experienced by the Primitive Methodists.
Links at British online archives to the Primitive Methodist Magazine and the Aldersgate Magazine which followed it starting in 1899.
"Website by David M Young on Primitive and old-time evangelical Methodism"

1811 establishments in England
Religious organizations established in 1811
Methodist denominations established in the 19th century
Christian terminology
Methodism in the United Kingdom
Methodist denominations in North America
History of Staffordshire